Soybean oil (British English: soyabean oil) is a vegetable oil extracted from the seeds of the soybean (Glycine max).  It is one of the most widely consumed cooking oils and the second most consumed vegetable oil. As a drying oil, processed soybean oil is also used as a base for printing inks (soy ink) and oil paints.

History
Chinese records dating prior to 2000 BCE mention use of cultivated soybeans to produce edible soy oil. Ancient Chinese literature reveals that soybeans were extensively cultivated and highly valued as a use for the soybean oil production process before written records were kept.

Production

To produce soybean oil, the soybeans are cracked, adjusted for moisture content, heated to between 60 and 88 °C (140–190 °F), rolled into flakes, and solvent-extracted with hexanes. The oil is then refined, blended for different applications, and sometimes hydrogenated.  Soybean oils, both liquid and partially hydrogenated are sold as "vegetable oil", or are ingredients in a wide variety of processed foods. Most of the remaining residue (soybean meal) is used as animal feed.

In the 2002–2003 growing season, 30.6 million tons (MT) of soybean oil were produced worldwide, constituting about half of worldwide edible vegetable oil production, and thirty percent of all fats and oils produced, including animal fats and oils derived from tropical plants.
In 2018–2019, world production was at 57.4 MT with the leading producers including China (16.6 MT), US (10.9 MT), Argentina (8.4 MT), Brazil (8.2 MT), and EU (3.2 MT).

Composition

.

Per 100 g, soybean oil has 16 g of saturated fat, 23 g of monounsaturated fat, and 58 g of polyunsaturated fat.  The major unsaturated fatty acids in soybean oil triglycerides are the polyunsaturates alpha-linolenic acid (C-18:3), 7-10%, and linoleic acid (C-18:2), 51%; and the monounsaturate oleic acid (C-18:1), 23%. It also contains the saturated fatty acids stearic acid (C-18:0), 4%, and palmitic acid (C-16:0), 10%.

The high-proportion of oxidation-prone polyunsaturated fatty acid is undesirable for some uses, such as cooking oils.  Three companies, Monsanto Company, DuPont/Bunge, and Asoyia in 2004 introduced low linolenic Roundup Ready soybeans. Hydrogenation may be used to reduce the unsaturation in linolenic acid. The resulting oil is called hydrogenated soybean oil.  If the hydrogenation is only partially complete, the oil may contain small amounts of trans fat.

Trans-fat is also commonly introduced during conventional oil deodorization, with a 2005 review detecting 0.4 to 2.1% trans content in deodorized oil.

Comparison to other vegetable oils

Applications

Food 
Soybean oil is mostly used for frying and baking.  It is also used as a condiment for salads.

Drying oils 
Soybean oil is one of many drying oils, which means that it will slowly harden (due to free-radical based polymerization) upon exposure to air, forming a flexible, transparent, and waterproof solid.  Because of this property, it is used in some printing ink and oil paint formulations. However, other oils (such as linseed oil) may be superior for some drying oil applications.

Medical uses 

Soybean oil is indicated for parenteral nutrition as a source of calories and essential fatty acids.

Fixative for insect repellents 
While soybean oil has no direct insect repellent activity, it is used as a fixative to extend the short duration of action of essential oils such as geranium oil in several commercial products.

Trading
Soybean oil is traded at the Chicago Board of Trade in contracts of 60,000 pounds at a time. Prices are listed in cents and thousandths of a cent per pound, with a minimum fluctuation of 5/1000 cents. It has been traded there since 1951.

Below are the CQG contract specifications for Bean Oil:

References

External links 
 

Soy products
Chinese inventions
Soy-based foods
Vegetable oils